Strange Creek is a stream in the U.S. state of West Virginia.

Strange Creek was named after William Strange, a pioneer who became lost and was not seen again.

See also
List of rivers of West Virginia

References

Rivers of Braxton County, West Virginia
Rivers of Nicholas County, West Virginia
Rivers of West Virginia